Vik is a village and the administrative center of Hole in Buskerud, Norway.

Vik is situated on the northeastern arm of  Steinsfjorden,  a branch of the Tyrifjorden. The administration buildings for Hole Municipality are located in Vik. The village of Vik was originally named for the Vik farm in an inlet of Steinsfjorden.

References

Villages in Buskerud
Hole, Norway